The Men's 1995 World Amateur Boxing Championships were held in the Deutschlandhalle in Berlin, Germany from May 4 to May 15. The eighth edition of this competition, held a year before the Summer Olympics in Atlanta, Georgia, was organised by the world governing body for amateur boxing AIBA. These World Championships saw the introduction of 'seedings' in each weight.  Those seedings were to be based on the 1994 AIBA ranking list.

Medal winners

Medal table

External links
Results on Amateur Boxing

World Amateur Boxing Championships
AIBA World Boxing Championships
B
Boxing Championships
May 1995 sports events in Europe
1995 in Berlin